Lavea Lala was a Western Samoan chief and politician. He served as a member of the Legislative Assembly from 1948 to 1951.

Biography
Following the creation of the Legislative Assembly in 1948, he  was chosen to represent Gaga'ifomauga by the three Fautua (high chiefs). However, he was not re-elected in 1951. In 1960 he was elected to the Constitutional Assembly that drew up the independence constitution, and was a signatory of the document.

References

Samoan chiefs
Members of the Legislative Assembly of Samoa